Dioscorea analalavensis is a herbaceous vine in the genus Dioscorea which is native to Madagascar.

References 

analalavensis
Taxa named by Joseph Marie Henry Alfred Perrier de la Bâthie
Taxa named by Henri Lucien Jumelle